Joël Merkler (born 25 October 2001) is a Spanish international rugby union player, who plays for Stade Toulousain.

Club career 

International career 
Merkler made his debut for Spain on 1 November 2021, replacing Andrés Alvarado during a remarkable 20–32 away win over Uruguay, that had just qualified for 2023 World Cup, as the American top team.

Style of play 
A tall and fairly massive player, Merkler is able to play both as a prop (mainly a tighthead) or a lock, higher in the forward pack.

References

External links

Stade Toulousain profile (in French)
FFR profile

2001 births
Sportspeople from Toulouse
Living people
French rugby union players
Spanish rugby union players
Spain international rugby union players
Rugby union props
Rugby union locks
Stade Toulousain players